Jhohanny Jean Bartermi (born February 5, 1988) is a Dominican taekwondo practitioner.

Early life
Jean was born in Monte Plata, of the Dominican Republic. His parents are of Haitian descent.

Career
Jhohanny started winning for his home country at the 2008 Pan American Championship in Caguas, Puerto Rico. There he won the silver medal after being defeated by the local Sebastián Crismanich.

Jean won the silver medal in the 2010 Central American and Caribbean Games at the Under 68 kg category.

At the 2011 Pan American Games in Guadalajara, Mexico Jhohanny won the gold medal defeating the Cuban Angel Mora.

References

1988 births
Living people
Dominican Republic male taekwondo practitioners
Dominican Republic people of Haitian descent
Afro-Dominican (Dominican Republic)
Taekwondo practitioners at the 2011 Pan American Games
Pan American Games gold medalists for the Dominican Republic
Pan American Games medalists in taekwondo
Central American and Caribbean Games silver medalists for the Dominican Republic
Competitors at the 2010 Central American and Caribbean Games
People from Monte Plata Province
Central American and Caribbean Games medalists in taekwondo
Medalists at the 2011 Pan American Games